Kritsana Wongbudee is a Thai retired footballer. He won the Thailand Premier League in 2008.

Honours
 Thailand Premier League 2008

References

Living people
Kritsana Wongbudee
1980 births
Association football midfielders
Sembawang Rangers FC players
Kritsana Wongbudee